Bizandeh (also Romanized as Bīzandeh; also known as Bezneh Deh) is a village in Ivughli Rural District, Ivughli District, Khoy County, West Azerbaijan Province, Iran. At the 2006 census, its population was 674, in 181 families.

References 

Populated places in Khoy County